Rammed earth is a technique for constructing foundations, floors, and walls using compacted natural raw materials such as earth, chalk, lime, or gravel. It is an ancient method that has been revived recently as a sustainable building method.

Under its French name of pisé it is also a material for sculptures, usually small and made in molds. It has been especially used in Central Asia and Tibetan art, and sometimes in China.

Edifices formed of rammed earth are on every continent except Antarctica, in a range of environments including temperate, wet, semiarid desert, montane, and tropical regions. The availability of suitable soil and a building design appropriate for local climatic conditions are the factors that favour its use.

The French term "pisé de terre" or "terre pisé" was sometimes used in English for architectural uses, especially in the 19th century.

The process

Making rammed earth involves compacting a damp mixture of subsoil that has suitable proportions of sand, gravel, clay, silt and stabilizer, if any, into a formwork (an externally supported frame or mold).

Historically, additives such as lime or animal blood were used to stabilize it.

The soil is compacted iteratively, in batches or courses, so as to gradually erect the wall up to the top of the formwork. Tamping was historically manual with a long ramming pole by hand, but modern construction systems can employ pneumatically-powered tampers.

After a wall is complete, it is sufficiently strong to immediately remove the formwork. This is necessary if a surface texture is to be applied, e.g., by wire brushing, carving, or mold impression, because the walls become too hard to work after approximately one hour. The compressive strength of rammed earth increases as it cures. Cement-stabilised rammed earth is cured for a minimum period of 28 days.

In modern rammed earth buildings, the walls are constructed on top of conventional footings or a reinforced concrete slab base.

The construction of an entire wall begins with a temporary frame, the "formwork", which is usually made of wood or plywood, as a mold for the desired shape and dimensions of each section of wall. The form must be durable and well braced, and the two opposing faces must be clamped together to prevent bulging or deformation caused by the large compressing forces. Formwork plays an important role in building rammed earth walls. Historically, wooden planks tied using rope were used to build walls. Modern builders use plywood and/or steel to build formwork.

Characteristics

The compressive strength of rammed earth is dictated by factors such as soil type, particle size distribution, amount of compaction, moisture content of the mix and type/amount of stabiliser used. Well-produced cement-stabilised rammed earth walls can be anywhere between 5 to 20 MPa. Higher compressive strength might require more cement. But addition of more cement can affect the permeability of the walls. Indeed, properly constructed rammed earth endures for thousands of years, as many ancient structures that are still standing around the world demonstrate. Rammed earth walls are reinforced with rebars in areas of high seismic activity.

Adding cement to soil mixtures low in clay can also increase the load-bearing capacity of rammed-earth edifices. The United States Department of Agriculture observed in 1925 that rammed-earth structures endure indefinitely and can be constructed for less than two-thirds of the cost of standard frame houses.

Rammed earth works require at least one skilled person for quality control. All other workers can be unskilled or semi-skilled.

One significant benefit of rammed earth is its high thermal mass: like brick or concrete, it absorbs heat during the day and releases heat at night. This action moderates daily temperature variations and reduces the need for air conditioning and heating. In colder climates, rammed-earth walls can be insulated by inserting insulation such as styrofoam or rigid fibreglass panels within internal and external layers of rammed earth. Depending on the type and content of binder, it must also be protected from heavy rain and insulated with vapour barriers. 

Rammed earth can effectively regulate humidity if unclad walls containing clay are exposed to an internal space. Humidity is regulated between 40% and 60%. The material mass and clay content of rammed earth allows an edifice to breathe more than concrete edifices, which avoids problems of condensation but prevents significant loss of heat.

Rammed-earth walls have the colour and texture of natural earth. Moisture-impermeable finishes, such as cement render, are not used by some people because they impair the ability of a wall to desorb moisture, which quality is necessary to preserve its strength.

Blemishes can be repaired using the soil mixture as a plaster and sanded smooth.

The thickness varies widely based on region and code. It can be as little as 6 inches (150mm) for non load-bearing walls and up to 24 inches (600mm) for load-bearing walls. The thickness and density of rammed-earth walls make them suitable for soundproofing. They are also inherently fireproof, resistant to termite damage, and non-toxic.

Environmental effects and sustainability

Edifices of rammed earth are more sustainable and environmentally friendly than other building techniques that use more cement and other chemicals. Because rammed-earth edifices use locally available materials, they usually have low embodied energy and generate very little waste. The soils used are typically subsoil which conserve the topsoil for agriculture. When the soil excavated in preparation for a foundation can be used, the cost and energy consumption of transportation are minimal. Rammed earth is probably the least environmentally detrimental construction material and technique that is readily and commercially available today to construct solid edifices. Rammed earth has potentially low manufacturing impact, contingent on the amount of cement and the amount that is locally sourced; it is often quarried aggregates rather than "earth".

Rammed earth can contribute to the overall energy efficiency of edifices: the density, thickness, and thermal conductivity of rammed earth render it an especially suitable material for passive solar heating.

Mixing cement with the soil can counteract sustainable benefits such as low embodied energy because manufacture of the cement itself creates 1.25 tonnes of carbon dioxide per tonne of cement produced. Although it has low greenhouse gas emissions in theory, transportation and the production of cement can add significantly to the overall emissions of modern rammed earth construction. The most basic kind of traditional rammed earth has very low greenhouse gas emissions but the more engineered and processed variant of rammed earth has the potential for significant emissions.

History

Evidence of ancient use of rammed earth has been found in Neolithic archaeological sites such as those of the Fertile Crescent, dating to the 9th–7th millennium BC, and of the Yangshao and Longshan cultures in China, dating to 5000 BCE. By 2000 BCE, rammed-earth architectural techniques (夯土 Hāng tǔ) were commonly used for walls and foundations in China.

United States and Canada
In the 1800s, rammed earth was popularized in the United States by the book Rural Economy by S. W. Johnson. The technique was used to construct the Borough House Plantation and the Church of the Holy Cross in Stateburg, South Carolina, both being National Historic Landmarks.

An outstanding example of a rammed-earth edifice in Canada is St. Thomas Anglican Church in Shanty Bay, Ontario, erected between 1838 and 1841.

From the 1920s through the 1940s rammed-earth construction in the US was studied. South Dakota State College extensively researched and constructed almost one hundred weathering walls of rammed earth. For over 30 years the college investigated the use of paints and plasters in relation to colloids in soil. In 1945, Clemson Agricultural College of South Carolina published the results of their research of rammed earth in a pamphlet titled "Rammed Earth Building Construction". In 1936, on a homestead near Gardendale, Alabama, the United States Department of Agriculture constructed an experimental rammed-earth edifices with architect Thomas Hibben. The houses were inexpensively constructed and were sold to the public along with sufficient land for gardens and small plots for livestock. The project was successful providing homes to low-income families.

The US Agency for International Development is working with developing countries to improve the engineering of rammed-earth houses. It also financed the authorship of the Handbook of Rammed Earth by Texas A&M University and the Texas Transportation Institute.

Interest in rammed earth declined after World War II when the cost of modern construction materials decreased. Rammed earth is considered substandard, and is opposed by many contractors, engineers, and tradesmen. The prevailing perception that such materials and techniques perform poorly in regions prone to earthquakes has prevented their use in much of the world. In Chile, for example, rammed earth edifices normally cannot be conventionally insured against damage or even be approved by the government.

A notable example of 21st-century use of rammed earth is the façade of the Nk'Mip Desert Cultural Centre in southern British Columbia, Canada. As of 2014 it is the longest rammed earth wall in North America.

See also
 Adobe
 Alker
 Cob, a very similar material that adds organic fiber to increase strength
 Earth block
 Earth sheltering, the architectural practice of using earth against building walls
 Green building
 Mudbrick
 Compressed earth block, individual bricks of highly compressed subsoil (and other natural additives) that can be utilized in normal masonry
 Polymer soil stabilization
 Sustainable architecture
 Vernacular architecture
 Craterre - This French institute provides training in earth construction techniques and in conjunction with UNESCO seeks to disseminate scientific and technical know-how on earthen architecture.

References

External sources
 Rammed earth wall construction at Central Arizona College

 
American inventions
Appropriate technology
Chinese inventions
Natural materials
Soil-based building materials
Sustainable building
Sustainable technologies